Walter Blake fitz John, Bishop of Clonmacnoise, County Offaly, Ireland, died 1508.

Blake was the son of John Blake fitz William, third Mayor of Galway (148788). His mother was Annabel Burke, and his brothers were Geoffrey, Andrew and Peter.

Blake was appointed Archbishop of Tuam on 8 August 1483 but did not take effect. He was appointed instead to Clonmacnoise on 26 March 1487. He served in that capacity till his death in 1508.

See also

 The Tribes of Galway
 Sir Valentine Blake, 1st Baronet,  merchant and Mayor of Galway 1611, 1630–31.
 Edmond Blake, last Mayor of the old Galway Corporation 1836–40.

References

 History of Galway, James Hardiman, Galway, 1820.
 Old Galway, Maureen Donovan O'Sullivan, 1942.
 Henry, William (2002). Role of Honour: The Mayors of Galway City 1485-2001. Galway: Galway City Council.  

People from County Galway
16th-century Irish bishops
Archbishops of Tuam
15th-century Roman Catholic bishops in Ireland